Gabriel Faure (15 May 1877 – 5 August 1962) was a French poet, novelist and essayist. He was the author of many books about Italy, and the editor of a book prefaced by Benito Mussolini. He won five prizes from the Académie française.

Early life
Gabriel Faure was born on 15 May 1877 in Tournon-sur-Rhône, in the department of Ardèche, France.

Career
Faure was the author of many poems, novels and essays. An Italophile, he wrote many books about Italy, including Venice, Ventimiglia and Rome. In 1929, he edited a book about Italy entitled Le Visage de l'Italie prefaced by Benito Mussolini. The book received a good review in The Journal of Roman Studies. Additionally, Faure was the founder of the Comité France-Italie.

Moreover, Faure wrote several books about French authors François-René de Chateaubriand, Jean-Jacques Rousseau, Stendhal, Paul Valéry and Louis Le Cardonnel. He co-authored a book about Napoleon with Marcel Deléon.

Faure won five prizes from the Académie française: the Prix Montyon for Heures d'Ombrie in 1908; the Prix Jules Davaine for Sur la vie Emilia in 1911; the Prix Marcelin Guérin for Paysages littéraires in 1918; the Prix Alfred Née in 1930; and the Grand Prix de Littérature for the entirety of his work in 1941.

He wrote in Italy some wrote, in particular he stayed several times in Breganze (Vicenza - Italy) guested to Marie Jsoard Savardo in 'Villa Savardo'. There are some post cards he sent in 1924 and 1928 from Breganze to France.

Death and legacy
Faure died on 5 August 1962. The Lycée Gabriel Faure in Tournon was named in his honor.

Works

References

1877 births
1962 deaths
People from Tournon-sur-Rhône
French poets
French novelists
French essayists